Dichomeris thalpodes is a moth in the family Gelechiidae. It was described by Edward Meyrick in 1922. It is found in Peru and Pará, Brazil.

The forewings are orange, indistinctly and suffusedly streaked with ferruginous on the veins and with broader streaks of deep ferruginous suffusion along the dorsum and posterior two-thirds of the costa, as well as some streaks of deep ferruginous suffusion in the cell. There are rather irregular dark reddish-fuscous marginal dots around the apex and termen. The hindwings are dark grey.

References

Moths described in 1922
thalpodes